Dulcie Evonne September (20 August 1935 – 29 March 1988) was a South African anti-apartheid political activist. Born in Athlone, Western Cape, South Africa, she was assassinated in Paris, France.

Early life
The second eldest daughter of Jakobus and Susan September, September grew up in Gleemore, a suburb of Cape Town, where she developed her interest in political activism. She began her primary schooling at Klipfontein Methodist Mission, and later attended Athlone High School. In 1954, she enrolled at the Wesley Training School in Salt River to pursue a career in teaching, and completed her Teacher's Diploma in 1955. She began her teaching career, first at City Mission School in Maitland, then at Bridgetown East Primary School in Athlone in 1956, and in 1957 became a member of the newly established Cape Peninsula Students' Union (CPSU), affiliate of the Unity Movement of South Africa, which aimed at overcoming racial divisions and forging solidarity among students of different cultural backgrounds. She belonged to the Athlone branch of the Teacher's League of South Africa (TLSA).

Activism
September subsequently joined the African Peoples Democratic Union of Southern Africa (APDUSA), established in 1960. She went on to be a member of the militant study group Yu Chi Chan Club, which was disbanded at the end of 1962, to be replaced by the National Liberation Front (NLF) in January 1963. While engaged in NLF activities, she was arrested and detained without trial at Roeland Street Prison on 7 October 1963. Together with nine others she was charged under the Criminal Procedure Act, the principal charge being "conspiracy to commit acts of sabotage, and incite acts of politically motivated violence". After months of court proceedings, judgment was delivered on 15 April 1964. September was sentenced to five years imprisonment, during which time she endured severe physical and psychological abuse. On her release in April 1969, the Pretoria regime controlled her activities with a five-year banning order, which prohibited her from engaging in political activity and from practising her profession. September then went to live with her sister in Paarl.

In 1973, as her banning order drew to a close, September applied for a permanent departure permit, having secured a position at Madeley College of Education in Staffordshire. She left South Africa on 19 December 1973. In London, she joined the activities of the Anti-Apartheid Movement and was in the frontline of numerous political rallies and demonstrations at South Africa House in Trafalgar Square. Later she gave up her job as a teacher and joined the staff of the International Defence and Aid Fund for Southern Africa. In 1976 she joined the African National Congress (ANC) where she worked in the ANC Women's League. In 1979, International Year of the Child (IYC), she was elected chairperson of the IYC Committee of the ANC Women's Section in London. At the end of 1983, September was appointed ANC Chief Representative in France, Switzerland and Luxembourg.

Death
On the morning of 28 March 1988, September was assassinated outside the ANC's Paris office at 28, Rue des Petites-Écuries, as she was opening the office after collecting the mail. She was shot five times in her head with a 22-calibre silenced rifle. She was 52 years old. Her death stoked a strong popular reaction in Paris where more than 20,000 gathered to mourn.

Before her assassination, September had been investigating trafficking of weapons between France and South Africa. Supposedly, this trafficking included nuclear materials. On the day after her murder, Alfred Nzo commented: "If ever there was a soft target, Dulcie September was one."

Legacy

Arts and media
Jean-Michel Jarre composed a song for his 1988 Revolutions album named "September", dedicated to September. The song was performed at his Destination Docklands concert at London's Royal Victoria Dock in October 1988.

The conceptual artist Hans Haacke devoted his 1989 installation "One Day, The Lions of Dulcie September Will Spout Water in Jubilation" to her. The site-specific intervention that modified an existing but defunct fountain in front of the Grande halle de la Villette in Paris, was part of the exhibition Magiciens de la terre by Jean-Martin Hubert.

Her short story "A Split Society – Fast Sounds on the Horizon" was included in the 1992 anthology Daughters of Africa, edited by Margaret Busby.

Cold Case: Revisiting Dulcie September is a play that pays tribute to Dulcie September. A book about her murder, Dulcie: Een Vrouw Die Haar Mond Moest Houden by Evelyn Groenink, was published in the Netherlands in 2001. A podcast about the murder of Dulcie September, They Killed Dulcie by Open Secrets and Sound Africa, was released in March 2019. The 2021 award winning documentary Murder in Paris explores the life and assassination of September, it was directed by Enver Samuel and edited by Nikki Comninos.

Memorials and dedications
A square in the 10th arrondissement of Paris is named after Dulcie September, and was officially inaugurated on 31 March 1998, ten years after her death. A street in Cléon, near Rouen, is named after her. There is also a place named Dulcie September in Nantes, and a primary school in Évry-sur-Seine carries her name as well as a middle school (collège in French) in Arcueil, the town near Paris where she last lived.

In August 2010, the first Dulcie September Memorial Lecture took place at The Centre for Humanities Research of the University of the Western Cape, as well as the launch of the Dulcie September Fellowship Awards in the Humanities and Social Sciences that featured speakers including Barbara Masekela and Margaret Busby.

In October 2011, Staffordshire University Students' Union honoured Dulcie September by renaming their boardroom the "September Room" and erecting a plaque in her memory. She was a former student of Madeley College of Education, one of the founding colleges of North Staffordshire Polytechnic.

In 2013 the Athlone Civic Centre was renamed the Dulcie September Civic Centre.

In Amsterdam, Netherlands, a road in the city's Transvaalbuurt is named Dulcie Septemberpad. Other buildings and streets in the neighbourhood have also been named after prominent historic South Africans, including Steve Bikoplein, Nelson Mandela School and Retiefstraat.

See also 
 List of people subject to banning orders under apartheid

References

1935 births
1980s murders in Paris
1988 deaths
1988 murders in France
Anti-apartheid activists
Assassinated activists
Assassinated South African activists
Assassinated South African people
Deaths by firearm in France
People murdered in Paris
South African activists
South African people murdered abroad
South African women activists
Women civil rights activists